Pavel Mikšík (born July 27, 1943) is a Slovak architect and designer working in the field of fountain design.

Biography
Pavel Mikšík was born in Bratislava, Czechoslovakia. He was introduced to fine arts in early childhood by his father. In school he excelled in both drawing and technical subjects. He decided on the Faculty of Architecture at the Slovak University of Technology in Bratislava. Mikšík changed to the Department of Sculpture at the Academy of Fine Arts and Design in Bratislava. He graduated in 1968.

Early works
After graduation Mikšík won another First prize, this time for Dr. Clementis Memorial.

Contemporary works
Mikšík has specialised in the creation of fountains, from interior and drinking fountains to large-scale monumental pieces.

Memberships
Mikšík is a member of Professional Artist Group ART-CLUB+8. He takes part in annual exhibitions. He works and lives near Bratislava, Slovakia.

List of major works
 (2006)         Monument with light effects in Zahorska Bystrica (Slovakia)
 (2005)         Fountain in the Main Square in Šamorín (Slovakia)
 (1995)         Fountain in the historical square in Dolny Kubin (Slovakia)
 (1993)         Fountain for the Karlskrohn Town Hall (Germany)
 (1993)         Fountain in Cham (Germany)

Exhibitions
 (1995) Pictures and Bronze Figures - Ingolstadt (Germany)
 (1988) Artprotis - Newark (USA)
 (1982) Bronze Figures - Zurich (Switzerland)

References

External links
 Official website 

1943 births
Living people
Architects from Bratislava
Slovak University of Technology in Bratislava alumni